Tropidonophis spilogaster, commonly known as the northern water snake or Boie's keelback, is a venomous keelback snake in the family Colubridae found in the Philippines on the islands of Catanduanes, Polillo, Calayan and in the province of Bataan on the island of Luzon.

References

Tropidonophis
Snakes of Southeast Asia
Reptiles of the Philippines
Endemic fauna of the Philippines
Reptiles described in 1827
Taxa named by Friedrich Boie